Cactus City is an unincorporated community in Riverside County, California. It lies at an elevation of 1667 feet (508 m).

Cactus City was founded in 1935. Cactus city contains a rest area along Interstate 10 bearing the same name.

References

Unincorporated communities in Riverside County, California
Populated places established in 1935
Unincorporated communities in California
1935 establishments in California